Boysidia is a genus of air-breathing land snails in the family Gastrocoptidae.

Species
 Boysidia chiangmaiensis Panha & J. B. Burch, 1999
 Boysidia conspicua (Möllendorff, 1885)
 Boysidia dilamellaris D.-N. Chen, Y.-H. Liu & W.-X. Wu, 1995
 Boysidia dorsata (Ancey, 1881)
 Boysidia elephas (van Benthem Jutting, 1950)
 Boysidia fengxianensis D.-N. Chen, Y.-H. Liu & W.-X. Wu, 1995
 Boysidia gongyaoshanensis H.-F. Yang, W.-H. Zhang & D.-N. Chen, 2012
 Boysidia gracilis Haas, 1937
 Boysidia hangchowensis (Pilsbry & Y. Hirase, 1908)
 Boysidia huangguoshuensis T.-C. Luo, D.-N. Chen & G.-Q. Zhang, 2000
 Boysidia hunana (Gredler, 1881)
 Boysidia hupeana (Gredler, 1901)
 Boysidia lamothei Bavay & Dautzenberg, 1912
 Boysidia megaphonum (van Benthem Jutting, 1950)
 Boysidia novemdentata Saurin, 1953
 Boysidia orientalis B. Rensch, 1935
 Boysidia pahpetensis Saurin, 1953
 Boysidia paini F. G. Thompson & Dance, 1983
 Boysidia paviei Bavay & Dautzenberg, 1912
 Boysidia pentadens D.-N. Chen, M. Wu & G.-Q. Zhang, 1999
 Boysidia perigyra (van Benthem Jutting, 1950)
 Boysidia phatangensis Dumrongrojwattana & Assawawattagee, 2018
 Boysidia procera F. G. Thompson & Dance, 1983
 Boysidia ringens van Benthem Jutting, 1950
 Boysidia robusta Bavay & Dautzenberg, 1912
 Boysidia salpinx F. G. Thompson & Dance, 1983
 Boysidia strophostoma (Möllendorff, 1885)
 Boysidia taibaiensis D.-N. Chen, M. Wu & G.-Q. Zhang, 1999
 Boysidia tamtouriana Pokryszko & Auffenberg, 2009
 Boysidia terae (Tomlin, 1939)
 Boysidia tholus Panha, 2002
 Boysidia xianfengensis W.-H. Zhang, D.-N. Chen & W.-C. Zhou, 2014
 Boysidia xiaoguanensis W.-H. Zhang, D.-N. Chen & W.-C. Zhou, 2014
 Boysidia xishanensis D.-N. Chen, M. Wu & G.-Q. Zhang, 1999

References

 Thompson, F. G. & Dance, S. P. (1983). Non-marine mollusks of Borneo. II Pulmonata: Pupillidae, Clausiliidae. III Prosobranchia: Hydrocenidae, Helicinidae. Bulletin of the Florida State Museum Biological Science. 29 (3): 101-152. Gainesville page(s): 105
 Bank, R. A. (2017). Classification of the Recent terrestrial Gastropoda of the World. Last update: July 16th, 2017

Gastrocoptidae
Cave snails
Gastropod genera